slackpkg is a software tool for installing or upgrading packages automatically through a network or over the Internet for Slackware. slackpkg was included in the main tree in Slackware 12.2 - previously it had been included in extras/ since Slackware 9.1. It is licensed under the GNU General Public License (GPL).

slackpkg is an automated package management tool written for Slackware as a shell script, like Swaret. It was designed to make a Slackware system administrator's job easier by allowing routine package management tasks to be accomplished in a single command. slackpkg does not replace the Slackware package management tools such as installpkg and upgradepkg; rather it uses them.

Some of the features of slackpkg include automated package installation, upgrading and searching. Many of these features, such as package deinstallation, can be performed more directly by using the Slackware package tools themselves, though their incorporation in slackpkg provides a more consistent user interface.

Slackpkg does not resolve dependencies between packages, like rpm from Fedora and openSUSE. Only third-party applications, such as slapt-get, have an automated package relation management.

See also

 pkgtool
 slapt-get

References

External links
 
 

Free package management systems
Linux package management-related software
Linux-only free software
Slackware